Will Harrison (born 30 July 1999 in Australia) is an Australian rugby union player who plays for the New South Wales Waratahs in Super Rugby. His playing position is fly-half. He has signed for the Waratahs squad in 2019. and was picked for the Wallabies in Late 2020 under coach Dave Rennie.

Reference list

External links
Rugby.com.au profile
itsrugby.co.uk profile

1999 births
Australian rugby union players
Living people
Rugby union fly-halves
Rugby union fullbacks
Sydney (NRC team) players
New South Wales Waratahs players